Inchiuvatu is a Sicilian musical group combining symphonic black metal mixed with Sicilian folk melodies, also played with fiscalettu, a traditional Sicilian flute, and a strong prominence of the piano.

Almost all lyrics are sung in Sicilian language, except for some occasional incursion in English and Italian.The sound of Inchiuvatu is often compared with that of many other symphonic black metal bands like Emperor or Dimmu Borgir, but their peculiar attitude and continuous link with the Sicilian traditions make their compositions unique.

The principal lyrical themes are sex, Christianity, anti-Christianity and existential drama, synthesised with the expression "Drama-Sex-Christ".

"Inchiuvatu" (nailed) isn't related only to Jesus but express the inability of man to face and sort out the great existential question of the meaning of life.

Releases
TrinaKa ["Trinacria" was the ancient name of Sicily and today is the name of its symbol] (EP, 1993)
Strurusia ["Mischievousness"] (EP, 1994)
Demoniu ["Demon"] (EP, 1994)
Venniri Santu ["Holy friday"] (Live EP, 1994)
Inchiuvatu ["Nailed"] (Demo album, 1995)
Addisiu ["Desire"] (Album, 1996)
Viogna  ["Shame"] (Album, 2000)
Piccatu ["Sin"] (Album, 2004)
Miseria ["Misery"] (Album, 2008)
33 (EP, 2008)
Ecce Homo ["Behold the Man"] (EP, 2011)
INRI (EP, 2013)
Via Matris (EP,2014)
Via Lucis (EP, 2017)

References

External links
 

Musical groups from Sicily
Italian black metal musical groups
Musical groups established in 1993
1993 establishments in Italy